Polovodovo is a rural locality (a selo) and the administrative center of Polovodovskoye Rural Settlement, Solikamsky District, Perm Krai, Russia. The population was 1,526 as of 2010. There are 42 streets.

Geography 
Polovodovo is located 19 km east of Solikamsk (the district's administrative centre) by road. Trenina is the nearest rural locality.

References 

Rural localities in Solikamsky District